Daniela Samulski (31 May 1984 – 22 May 2018) was a German swimmer who won three medals at the 2009 World Championships. She competed at the 2000 and 2008 Olympics in five events, and her best achievement was fourth place in the 4 × 100 m freestyle relay in 2000. Samulski retired in early 2011 to concentrate on her studies.

On 22 May 2018, nine days before her 34th birthday, Samulski died of cancer.

See also
 World record progression 50 metres backstroke

References

1984 births
2018 deaths
Swimmers from Berlin
German female swimmers
Swimmers at the 2000 Summer Olympics
Swimmers at the 2008 Summer Olympics
Olympic swimmers of Germany
World record setters in swimming
German female freestyle swimmers
World Aquatics Championships medalists in swimming
European Aquatics Championships medalists in swimming
Deaths from cancer in Germany
20th-century German women
21st-century German women